Masing is a German and Estonian surname. Notable people with the surname include:

 (1836–1923), Baltic German philologist
 (1845–1936), Baltic German linguist
Jaan Masing (1875–1948), Estonian politician and physician
Johannes Masing (born 1959), German judge, jurisprudent and public law scholar
 (1879–1956), Baltic German physician
 (1874–1947), Baltic German philologist
Otto Wilhelm Masing (1763–1832), Estonian linguist and clergyman
Uku Masing (1909–1985), Estonian philosopher, translator, theologist and folklorist
Viktor Masing (1925–2001), Estonian botanist and ecologist
Walter Masing (1915–1924), Baltic German physicist

German-language surnames
Estonian-language surnames